Life Ain't No Joke is a mixtape by American hip hop recording artist Lil Durk; hosted by DJ Moondawg and DJ Victoriouz. It was released on October 19, 2012, by his independently record label OTF. As of October 31st, 2022, the mixtape has been downloaded over 259,000 times on DatPiff and is certified platinum.

Reception
Pitchfork Media's Jordan Sargent noted that Lil Durk, unlike fellow Chicago rappers Chief Keef and Lil Reese, "leans heavily on one under-discussed aspect of drill music: Autotune, and drowning music in it." Sargent remarked that several songs on the mixtape make use of the effect "to no real positive outcome", with the exceptions of "Right Here" and, in particular, "Molly Girl", which he called "one of the tape's clear highlights." In an interview with The Morning News, Durk said that singing on such tracks as "Molly Girl" makes him more versatile than the average rapper. "I think I can switch up any type of genre song," he says. "If I knew about country, I can make a country song." Corban Goble of Stereogum wrote: "Life Ain’t No Joke is a great title for this set of songs; while there’s this urgency instilled in these teenagers by the dire circumstances of their upbringing, the threat of falling in with the wrong people and finding yourself at the front end of a life sentence always looms above them."

Track listing

References

External links
Life Ain't No Joke at DatPiff

2012 mixtape albums
Lil Durk albums